Stephanotis is a genus of flowering plants first described in 1806. The name derives from the Greek  stephanōtís  (feminine adj.) fit for a crown, derivative of stéphanos  (masculine) crown. It contains evergreen, woody-stemmed lianas with a scattered distribution in several tropical and subtropical regions.

Stephanotis are grown for their strongly perfumed, waxy, tubular, usually white flowers. Leaves are opposite, ovate to elliptic, and leathery. Stephanotis is a beautiful but difficult plant - it hates sudden changes in temperature, needs constant cool conditions in winter and is attractive to scale and mealy bug. The stems of Stephanotis can reach 10 ft or more, but it is usually sold twined around a wire hoop. The heavily scented waxy flowers appear in summer.

The best known species is Stephanotis floribunda (Madagascar jasmine), which is cultivated as a tropical or hothouse ornamental, and whose flowers are a popular element in wedding bouquets.

The Stephanotis has grown in popularity over the past few years along with some of the other spring flowering vines.  It is known by a few different names such as “Madagascar jasmine” and “bridal veil”.

Species

formerly included
transferred to other genera (Jasminanthes, Marsdenia)

References

Apocynaceae genera
Asclepiadoideae